The Iraqi Handball Federation (IHF) is the administrative and controlling body for handball in Republic of Iraq. Founded in 1972, IHF is a member of the Asian Handball Federation and member of the International Handball Federation since 1976.

IHF Executive Committee
Following is the IHF Executive Committee for the term 2018 – 2022.

Competitions hosted
HFI had hosted following international championships:

National teams
 Iraq men's national handball team
 Iraq men's national junior handball team
 Iraq women's national handball team

References

External links
 Iraq at the IHF website.
 Iraq at the AHF website.

Sports organizations established in 1972
1972 establishments in Iraq
Handball governing bodies
Sports governing bodies in Iraq
Asian Handball Federation
National members of the International Handball Federation